Staniek is a Polish surname. Notable people with the surname include:

 Gerda Staniek (born 1925), Austrian athlete
 Marcin Staniek (born 1980), Polish footballer
 Ryszard Staniek (born 1971), Polish footballer

Polish-language surnames